John Durant (fl. 1399–1401), of Alsthorpe, Rutland, was an English politician.

There was an unsubstantiated suggestion that he was the son of Sir Henry Durant and his wife, Margaret St. Liz, whose family included other MPs for Rutland. He may have been related to them in some regard.
 
He was a Member (MP) of the Parliament of England for Rutland in 1399 and 1401.

References

14th-century births
15th-century deaths
English MPs 1399
English MPs 1401
People from Burley, Rutland